Roger Delrue (born 26 April 1887, date of death unknown) was a Belgian equestrian. He competed at the 1924 Summer Olympics and the 1928 Summer Olympics.

References

External links
 

1887 births
Year of death missing
Belgian male equestrians
Olympic equestrians of Belgium
Equestrians at the 1924 Summer Olympics
Equestrians at the 1928 Summer Olympics
Place of birth missing